Colotis rogersi, the Rogers' orange tip, is a butterfly in the family Pieridae. It is found in northern Kenya, southern Ethiopia and south-eastern Sudan. The habitat consists of very dry savanna.

The larvae feed on Capparis species.

References

Butterflies described in 1915
rogersi